The 1972 NFL season was the 53rd regular season of the National Football League.  The Miami Dolphins became the first (and to date the only) NFL team to finish a championship season undefeated and untied when they beat the Washington Redskins in Super Bowl VII. The Dolphins not only led the NFL in points scored, while their defense led the league in fewest points allowed, the roster also featured two running backs who gained 1,000 rushing yards in the same season.

Colts and Rams exchange owners
On July 13, Robert Irsay and Willard Keland bought the Los Angeles Rams  from the estate of Dan Reeves and transferred ownership to Carroll Rosenbloom, in exchange for ownership of the Baltimore Colts.

Draft
The 1972 NFL Draft was held from February 1 to 2, 1972 at New York City’s Essex House. With the first pick, the Buffalo Bills selected defensive end Walt Patulski from the University of Notre Dame.

New officials
Referee Jack Vest, the referee for Super Bowl II, the 1969 AFL championship game and 1971 AFC championship game, was killed in a June motorcycle accident. Chuck Heberling was promoted from line judge to fill the vacancy and kept Vest's crew intact. Heberling's line judge vacancy was filled by Red Cashion, who was promoted to referee in 1976 and worked in the league through 1996, earning assignment to Super Bowl XX and Super Bowl XXX.

Major rule changes
Since the  season, they had been  from the sideline [ apart].
With the hashmarks now the same width as the goalposts, a team punting from inside its 15-yard line could snap the ball from a spot even with the marked field numbers instead of the hashmarks to avoid the punt hitting the goalpost. 
Field number markings were standardized across the league, both in size and position.
Prior to 1972, the Oakland Raiders' field numbers were inside a silver shield, and the Denver Broncos and  San Diego Chargers used diamonds to mark numbers. 
The fields for the Houston Oilers and New Orleans Saints had field numbers closer to the sidelines than most stadiums, since they were marked with both NFL and collegiate hashmarks.
Yard lines ending in "5" could not be marked. In 1971, the Buffalo Bills and New York Giants were the last teams to mark yard lines every five yards instead of ten. 
If a legal receiver goes out of bounds, either accidentally or forced out, and returns to touch or catch the pass in bounds, the penalty is a loss of down (but no penalty yardage will be assessed).
If a punt or missed field goal crosses the receivers' goal line, a member of the receiving team may advance the ball into the field of play. Previously, the ball was dead when a scrimmage kick crossed the goal line and the receivers were awarded an automatic touchback.
All fouls committed by the offensive team behind the line of scrimmage will be assessed from the previous spot.
Tie games, previously ignored in computing of winning percentage, were made equal to a half-game win and a half-game loss.
This was the first season third-down conversions were recorded as an official statistic.

Division races
From  through , there were three divisions (East, Central and West) in each conference.  The winners of each division, and a fourth "wild card" team based on the best non-division winner, qualified for the playoffs.  The tiebreaker rules were changed to start with head-to-head competition, followed by division records, common opponents records, and conference play.

National Football Conference

American Football Conference

Final standings

Playoffs

Awards

Coaching changes

Offseason
Buffalo Bills: After finishing with a 1–13 record in 1971, Harvey Johnson was reassigned to the team's scouting department. Lou Saban then was named as Johnson's replacement, beginning his second stint after serving as the Bills head coach from 1962 to 1965.
Chicago Bears: Abe Gibron replaced the fired Jim Dooley.
Denver Broncos: John Ralston joined the Broncos as head coach. Lou Saban left the team after a 2–6–1 start in 1971. Offensive line coach Jerry Smith served as interim for the remaining five games.
Houston Oilers: Ed Hughes resigned and was replaced by Bill Peterson.
Philadelphia Eagles: Ed Khayat began his first full season as head coach. He replaced Jerry Williams, who was fired after three games in 1971.

In-season
Baltimore Colts: Don McCafferty was fired after going 1-4 to start the season. John Sandusky was named as replacement.
New England Patriots: John Mazur resigned after going 2-7 to start the season. Phil Bengtson then served as interim.

Stadium changes
 The Kansas City Chiefs moved their home games from Municipal Stadium to Arrowhead Stadium at the Truman Sports Complex and became the twelfth team (of 26) to play its home games on artificial turf.

Uniform changes
 The Denver Broncos discontinued wearing orange pants with their white jerseys as they had done from 1968-71. The orange pants returned in 1978 and '79. 
 The Detroit Lions added outlines to the jersey numbers
 The Houston Oilers switched from silver to blue helmets. They also discontinued their silver pants in favor of white pants for their blue jerseys, and blue pants for their white jerseys. These uniforms lasted three seasons. 
 The Miami Dolphins reinstated their white jersey with alternating aqua and orange stripes on the sleeves, which was discontinued when Don Shula became coach. However, this style was not universally adopted, and several notable players, including Bob Griese and Larry Csonka, continued to wear the 1970-71 white jersey with plain sleeves. The Dolphins' aqua jerseys from 1970-71 with plain sleeves, worn twice in 1972 (vs. Buffalo in week 6 and St. Louis in week 11), remained unchanged. 
 The Washington Redskins switched from gold to burgundy helmets, and from the "R" helmet logo (designed by the late Vince Lombardi) to the Native American head logo. The helmet remained unchanged, save for changing from gray face masks to gold in 1978 and a modified logo for 1982 only, until the Redskins nickname was retired prior to the 2020 season.

Television
This was the third year under the league's four-year broadcast contracts with ABC, CBS, and NBC to televise Monday Night Football, the NFC package, and the AFC package, respectively.

References

 NFL Record and Fact Book
 Total Football: The Official Encyclopedia of the National Football League

External links
 NFL History 1971–1980 (Last accessed December 4, 2005)

National Football League seasons
National Football League